Julia Minor (before 100 BC – 51 BC) was the second of two daughters of Gaius Julius Caesar and Aurelia. She was an elder sister of the dictator Julius Caesar, and the maternal grandmother of Rome's first emperor Augustus.

Biography

Bona Dea scandal
It is not known if it was the elder or the younger of the dictator's sisters who gave evidence against Publius Clodius Pulcher when he was impeached for impiety in 61 BC. Julia and her mother gave the legal courts a detailed account of the affair he had with Pompeia, Julius Caesar's wife. Caesar divorced Pompeia over the scandal.

Marriage and offspring
Julia married Marcus Atius Balbus, a praetor and commissioner who came from a senatorial family of plebeian status. Julia bore him three (or two, according to other sources) daughters and possibly a son named Marcus Atius Balbus. The second daughter was the mother of Octavia Minor (fourth wife of triumvir Mark Antony) and of Romes first Emperor Augustus. Her youngest daughter was the wife of Lucius Marcius Philippus, and they had a daughter named Marcia.

Another Atia, who may have been her granddaughter through her son (probably from a marriage to a Claudia) may have been married to Gaius Junius Silanus. This Atia was the mother of Gaius Junius Silanus who became consul in AD 10. Sons of the consul in 10 were Appius Junius Silanus (consul in 28), Decimus Junius Silanus (who was involved in the disgrace of Julia the Younger) and Marcus Junius Silanus (consul suffectus in 15).

Balbus died in 52 BC and Julia died a year later. At age 12 Octavius, her youngest grandson, the future Emperor Augustus, delivered her funeral oration.

References

Sources
 Suetonius - The Twelve Caesars - Caesar and Augustus.
 Julia, Dictionary of Greek and Roman Biography and Mythology

100s BC births
51 BC deaths
2nd-century BC Roman women
1st-century BC Roman women
1st-century BC Romans
Family of Augustus
Family of Julius Caesar
Julii Caesares